Non-Qatari Afghans make up a small community of about 3,500 in the country of Qatar, though the embassy in Doha says the population is higher than that.

References

Qatar
Ethnic groups in Qatar